The 1952 FA Cup final was the final match of the 1951–52 staging of the Football Association Challenge Cup (better known as the FA Cup), English football's main cup competition. The match was contested by Newcastle United and Arsenal at Wembley Stadium in London on 3 May 1952. It was hitherto only the second time that an FA Cup Final was played in May; 1937 being the first.  Newcastle appeared in their 11th final in total and their second successive final, while it was Arsenal's sixth final and their second in three years.


Match facts

Match summary
Arsenal played Newcastle United with several recovering players rushed back into the first team; Walley Barnes was taken off injured with a twisted knee after 35 minutes (no substitutes were allowed then), and ten-man Arsenal suffered further injuries to Holton, Roper and Daniel, so that by the end of the match they had only seven fit players on the pitch; with the numerical advantage in their favour, Newcastle won 1–0 with a goal from George Robledo. The goal scored by Robledo was drawn by a young John Lennon, who included it in the artwork of his album Walls and Bridges in 1974.

Broadcasting
Despite late efforts to overturn the decision by a minority of its members, The FA Council banned the BBC from televising the game, leaving those who could not attend, with only updates on the first half on BBC radio before the second half was described live to listeners. To date this remains the last cup final not to be broadcast live on television, although the game was filmed by newsreel for showing that evening in cinemas. The BBC instead broadcast a cricket match between Worcestershire and the touring Indians.

References

External links
 Match Report
 FA Cup Final lineups
 FA Cup Final kits, 1950–59

FA Cup Final
FA Cup Finals
FA Cup Final 1952
FA Cup Final 1952
FA Cup Final
FA Cup Final